Spike: Shadow Puppets is a limited series comic book based on the Angel television series. The Spike centric comic was released by IDW Publishing from June 2007 through October 2007. The four issues were collected together in a single trade paperback in December, 2007.

Continuity
 The continuity of this comic is unconfirmed. A scene on page 3 of issue #2 with Angel, Illyria, and Wesley at Wolfram & Hart, indicates it occurring during the final episodes of Angel season five, sometime after "Shells", but before "Not Fade Away". The fact that Wesley is still alive in Spike's brief fantasy in issue #2 seems to imply that the story takes place prior to "Not Fade Away". However, a dead "Spoiler Wesley" appears in issue #4.
 Shadow Puppets best shares continuity with the previous Spike: Asylum series, of which writer Brian Lynch commented "...I'm just telling the best SPIKE story I can, timelines be damned."
 The original ambiguity of Shadow Puppets place in the continuity is directly referenced (through use of a pun) in issue #1, when the puppets attack Spike with the "Official Smile Time Cannon", Spike remarks "I hate... official cannon."
 The character Betta George, who appears in this comic and Asylum, later appears in the definitely canonical Angel: After the Fall miniseries.

Canonical issues

Angel comics such as this one are not usually considered by fans as canonical. Some fans consider them stories from the imaginations of authors and artists, while other fans consider them as taking place in an alternative fictional reality. However unlike fan fiction, overviews summarising their story, written early in the writing process, were 'approved' by both Fox and Joss Whedon (or his office), and the books were therefore later published as officially Buffy merchandise.

References

External links
 Johnston, Rich, "LYING IN THE GUTTERS VOLUME 2 COLUMN 92", ComicBookResources.com (February 20, 2007).
 "Teaser for the next Lynch/Urru SPIKE project!", IDWpublishing.com (January 22, 2007).
 June solicitations on Comics Continuum

Angel (1999 TV series) comics
IDW Publishing titles
2007 comics debuts
2007 comics endings
Comic book limited series
Comics based on Buffy the Vampire Slayer
Fantasy comics